Yishun MRT station is an above-ground Mass Rapid Transit (MRT) station on the North South line (NSL) in Yishun, Singapore. The station is located at the junction of Yishun Avenue 2 and Yishun Avenue 5, and is currently one of the two MRT stations that serve Yishun New Town; the other being Khatib station.

Yishun station was the terminus of the NSL upon its completion on 20 December 1988, until the Woodlands Extension of the NSL was completed and opened on 10 February 1996.

History

Yishun opened on 20 December 1988, two years earlier than planned. During the start of construction in December 1984, Nee Soon North― the original name of the station― was renamed to Yishun and Nee Soon South was renamed to Khatib.

Yishun station was one of the first three stations to undergo testing as to whether the platform screen doors were viable for elevated stations. Eventually, installation of the half-height platform screen doors started on 26 August 2009 and operations commenced on 2 December that year. Half-height screen doors have been installed in all elevated stations since. Yishun station also have high-volume low-speed fans installed, which started operations since 27 June 2012.

Yishun station was also the first batch of ten stations to have additional bicycle parking facilities under a National Cycling Plan announced in 2010.

Incidents

In 1990, there was a power failure which occurred at Yishun station.

In December 2001, the Singapore embassies attack plot was discovered, and had included plans to bomb Yishun MRT station at several points, including the sewers near the station. This was brought up in a debate during a session of the parliament, during which new security measures were proposed, especially on the MRT system itself.

On 16 April 2003, power supply to trackside equipment between Yio Chu Kang and Sembawang stations was disrupted at 8:02am due to a lightning strike which affected eight point machines along the track. After the SMRT staff manually secured the points and fixed the positions, northbound train services were restored at 8:30am while southbound services were restored at 8:48am.

On the early morning of 5 December 2006, a foreign worker in his early twenties, was hit by a southbound train at the station and caused trains from Sembawang to Yio Chu Kang stations to be disrupted for more than an hour. He was later pronounced dead. In February 2007, a leaked CCTV footage of the incident along with another at Admiralty station began circulating on the Internet, with the man in question crawling from under the platform and onto the track as the train approaches, leading to suggestions that it was a case of suicide.

On 19 January 2008 at about 3:30pm (SST), a call was made from a public telephone at the MRT Station alleging that there was a bomb at the station. Police arrested a 31-year old Chinese man believed to be linked to the crime on 23 February that year at 4:00pm. The man was charged on 25th of that month for transmitting a false message that makes reference to a bomb.

At 11:45am on 11 October that year, a man was found on the tracks of the station and was sent to hospital. Train service was disrupted in between Sembawang and Yio Chu Kang stations, affecting 2,900 people. Regular service resumed at 12:16pm.

Notes and references

Notes

References

External links

 

Railway stations in Singapore opened in 1988
Yishun
Mass Rapid Transit (Singapore) stations